Kim Seong Joong (Hangul 김성중; born 1975) is a South Korean writer. She studied creative writing at Myongji University and began her literary career in 2008 when “Nae euijareul dolyeojusaeyo” (내 의자를 돌려주세요 Please Return My Chair) won the JoongAng New Writer's Award. Her short story collections include Gaegeuman (개그맨 Comedian) and Gukgyeongsijang (국경시장 Border Market).

Life 
Kim made her literary debut at the age of 33. After graduating university, she drifted between jobs including reporting for several magazines that are now out of print, ghostwriting autobiographies, and game writing, until her short story “Nae euijareul dolyeojusaeyo” (내 의자를 돌려주세요 Please Return My Chair) won the JoongAng New Writer's Award in 2008. Despite her relatively late debut, Kim's work quickly drew the attention of literary circles. In 2010, she received the inaugural Moonji Literary Award, and went on to win the Munhakdongne Young Writers' Award for a record-breaking three consecutive years from 2010 to 2012. Her first short story collection Gaegeuman (개그맨 Comedian), published in 2011, earned critical acclaim. Literary critic Wu Chan Je compared it to “a kaleidoscope in midair” and Seo Hui Won noted that “the writer’s imagination switches gears as fast as a chameleon darts across a blooming flower field.” Her second short story collection Gukgyeongsijang (국경시장 Border Market) was published in 2015.

Writing 
Kim works with various subjects and multiple genres. This is why, rather than applying any one label to her such as a “realist” or “modernist,” she is better understood as a writer who experiments with different styles that suit the imaginative background of each story. The work that put Kim on the literary map is Gaegeuman (개그맨 Comedian), her first collection of short stories including: “Heogong-eui aideul” (허공의 아이들 Children in the Air), which depicts a boy and a girl growing up in an apocalyptic world reminiscent of Hayao Miyazaki’s Castle in the Sky; and “Gebal seoninjang” (게발 선인 장 Christmas Cactus), a story dealing with a religious cult that has one leader, one follower, and one apostate. Kim’s imaginative style is also apparent in her second short story collection Gukgyeongsijang (국경시장 Border Market), which includes the titular “Border Market” (featuring a marketplace where customers have to sell their memories to buy something) and “Kumun” (a story of a woman who chooses a short and painful life to obtain the gift of genius).

Works 
1. 『개그맨』, 문학과지성사, 2011.

Comedian. Moonji, 2011.

2. 『국경시장』, 문학동네, 2015.

Border Market. Munhakdongne, 2015.

Works in translation 
1. Asia Literary Review : Spring 2017 (English)

2. AZALEA (Journal of Korean Literature & Culture) : Volume Nine (English)

3. Asia Literary Review : Spring 2016 (English)

Awards 
2008: 9th JoongAng New Writer's Award

2010: 1st Munhakdongne Young Writers’ Award

2010: 1st Moonji Literary Award

2011: 2nd Munhakdongne Young Writers’ Award

2012: 3rd Munhakdongne Young Writers’ Award

Further reading 
서희원, ｢이 소설가, 잔뼈가 굵다!; 김성중 소설집 『개그맨』｣, 『문학과사회』, 2011년 겨울호.

Seo, Hui Won. “This Novelist Knows What She’s Doing! Kim Seong Joong’s Short Story Collection Comedian.” Literature & Society, 2011 Winter Issue.

우찬제, ｢불안의 만화경, 만돌라의 상상력 ; 김성중의 ｢그림자｣｣, 『문학과사회』, 2009년 여름호.

Wu, Chan Je. “A Kaleidoscope of Anxiety, the Imagination of a Mandala: Kim Seong Joong’s Shadow.” Literature & Society, 2009 Summer Issue.

백지은, ｢정오의 소설｣, 『작가세계』, 2011년 여름호.

Baek, Ji Eun. “Novels at Their Noon.” Writer’s World, 2011 Summer Issue.

양윤의, ｢빠져나가는 것｣, 『문학과사회』, 2010년 가을호.

Yang, Yun Eui. “What Slips Out.” Literature & Society, 2010 Fall Issue.

External links 
1. ｢전모를 털어놓아도 끝내 비밀로 남는 순간의 신비-『국경시장』｣, 『한국일보』, 2016.11.05.

Hwang, Su Hyeon. “Border Market: The Mystery of the Moment When the Full Story is Told but It Still Remains a Secret.” The Hankook-Ilbo. Last modified November 5, 2016. Accessed February 20, 2017. http://www.hankookilbo.com/v/54e92a036685460cb74b7f3aecd7e17a.

2. ｢환상의 문 열어젖힌 천부적 이야기꾼-『국경시장』｣, 『매일경제』, 2015.07.13.

Kim, Seul Gi. “Border Market: A Born Storyteller who Flung Open the Door to Fantasy.” Maeil Business News Korea. Last modified July 13, 2015. Accessed February 20, 2017.

http://news.mk.co.kr/newsRead.php?year=2015&no=667387.

3. ｢현실과 환상 사이에서 균형 잡기｣, 『한겨레』, 2015.02.26.

Choi, Jae Bong. “Striking a Balance between Reality and Fantasy.” The Hankyoreh. Last modified February 26, 2015. Accessed February 20, 2017.

http://www.hani.co.kr/arti/culture/book/679992.html#csidx658bf4b148c164187415e29aef175bf.

4. ｢남루함으로 기억될 그 이름... ‘인간’-『개그맨』｣, 『문화일보』, 2011.09.26.

Kim, Yeong Beon. “Comedian: Humanity will be Remembered by its Battered Name.” Munhwa Ilbo. Last modified September 26, 2011. Accessed February 20, 2017.

http://www.munhwa.com/news/view.html?no=2011092601032530065004.

5. ｢자유분방한 상상력 가득한 단편소설 9편 - 『개그맨』｣, 『서울신문』, 2011.10.15.

Son, Won Cheon. “Comedian: Nine Short Stories Teeming with Wild Imagination.” Seoul Shinmun. Last modified October 15, 2011. Accessed February 20, 2017.

http://www.seoul.co.kr/news/newsView.php?id=20111015020007#csidxd2a6928d916bf829751f5e5bedb09f6.

6. ｢허공으로 떠오르는 세상..상상력의 세계 - 『개그맨』｣, 『연합뉴스』, 2011.09.23.

“Comedian: A World Rising up through the Air...A World of Imagination.” Yonhap News Agency. Last modified September 23, 2011. Accessed February 20, 2017.

http://news.naver.com/main/read.nhn?mode=LSD&mid=sec&sid1=103&oid=001&aid=0005279882.

References 

Living people
1975 births